Elegia omichleuta is a species of moth of the family Pyralidae. It was described by Edward Meyrick in 1934 and is found in Sudan.

References

Moths described in 1934
Phycitini
Moths of Africa